A lipsanotheca (Italian lipsanoteca) is a reliquary, specifically a small box containing the actual relics inside a reliquary. The term derives from Greek through Late Latin. In modern English, it usually refers to a small number of individual very old reliquaries, most often the 4th century ivory Brescia Casket, which is the most likely meaning of the plain term, especially in its Italian version. A 13th century wooden box in Alicante, Spain, is also called a lipsanotheca.

The National Museum of Catalan Art (MNAC) in Barcelona has a digitized display that references another famous 10th century lipsanotheca made of stone called the Lipsanotheca of Santa Maria de Lillet.  See Google images.

References

Christian reliquaries